N8 Identity is an identity and access management (IAM) provider headquartered in Ontario, Canada. It sells identity and access orchestration through the lifecycle of a user within an organization: onboarding, change in responsibility, ad hoc self-service and offboarding.

History
Privately held and based in Burlington, Ontario, N8 Identity is Canada’s largest dedicated Identity and Access Management (IAM) provider. The company was founded in 2000 as an identity and access management consulting business.  In 2006 the company developed Employee Lifecycle Manager (ELM), which it released in 2007, transitioning from a consultant into a provider.

Technology
Identity and access management (IAM) help organizations improve information security and compliance.  N8 Identity specializes in identity and access orchestration through the lifecycle of a user within an organization: onboarding, change in responsibility, ad hoc self-service and offboarding.

Employee Lifecycle Manager was the first IAM the company released. ELM has been described as incorporating organizational controls within business processes and solving compliance requirements, preventing access policy breaches. ELM is designed for compliance with SOX, HIPAA, PIPEDA and other federal security regulations.

N8 Identity also offers ELM Utility, a turn-key SaaS (software as a service) offering for employee on-boarding, change in responsibility and offboarding processes.

References

Online companies of Canada
Companies based in Burlington, Ontario